Laiza Carrillo Mesa (born November 27, 1968) is a retired female long and triple jumper, who also competed in the heptathlon during her career. She set her personal best (14.43 metres) in the women's triple jump event on 1995-02-23 in Havana.

International competitions

References
Profile

1968 births
Living people
Cuban female long jumpers
Cuban female triple jumpers
Cuban heptathletes
Athletes (track and field) at the 1991 Pan American Games
Athletes (track and field) at the 1995 Pan American Games
Pan American Games medalists in athletics (track and field)
Pan American Games gold medalists for Cuba
Central American and Caribbean Games bronze medalists for Cuba
Competitors at the 1990 Central American and Caribbean Games
Central American and Caribbean Games medalists in athletics
Medalists at the 1995 Pan American Games
20th-century Cuban women
20th-century Cuban people